National Highway 127A (NH 127A) is a  National Highway in India.

References

National highways in India
National Highways in Assam